A paper plane is a toy plane made out of paper.

Paper plane may also refer to:

Music

Aeroplanes
Paper Aeroplane, an EP by Rosie Thomas
Paper Aeroplanes, an alternative pop band from West Wales formed around 2009

Airplanes
Paper Airplane (album), a 2011 album by Alison Krauss & Union Station
"Paper Airplanes", a song by Ruth B. and Terrence Blanchard
"Paper Airplanes (makeshift wings)", a song by alternative rock band AFI from the album Sing the Sorrow

Planes
"Paper Plane" (song), a 1972 song by Status Quo
"Paper Planes" (Hoseah Partsch song), 2017
"Paper Planes" (M.I.A. song), 2008
Paper Planes – Homeland Security Remixes EP, a 2008 EP by M.I.A.
"Paper Planes", a song by I'm from Barcelona from their 2008 album Who Killed Harry Houdini?

Other uses 
Paper Planes (film), a 2015 film
Paper Plane, a DSiWare game found in WarioWare, Inc.: Mega Microgames!
Paper Plane (cocktail), a cocktail named after the song by M.I.A. 
 "Paper Airplane" (The Office), an episode of the American comedy television series The Office